Mobaraki-ye Do (also Romanized as Mobārakī-ye Do and Mobārakī Do; also known as ‘Abbās, ‘Arab ‘Abbās, Mobārakeh-ye Do, and Mobārakī) is a village in Soveyseh Rural District, in the Soveyseh District of Karun County, Khuzestan Province, Iran. At the 2006 census, its population was 329, in 62 families.

References 

Populated places in Karun County